The International Masonic Union Catena is an international organization of Masonic organizations.  The organizations involved are considered irregular by the United Grand Lodge of England (UGLE) and most other Anglo-Saxon Grand Lodges.

History
The organization was created in 1961 by the Nederlandse grootloge der gemengde vrijmetsalerij, Humanitas – Freimaurergroßloge für Frauen und Männer in Deutschland and Österreichischer Universaler Freimaurerorden - Humanitas. It is only for mixed masonic organizations.

The Catena is open only to lodges that acknowledge a Supreme Being (Great Architect of the Universe).

Members

Present members
 Humanitas – Freimaurergroßloge für Frauen und Männer in Deutschland (Germany)
 Österreichischer Universaler Freimaurerorden - Humanitas (Austria)
 Order of the Ancient Free Masonry for Men and Women (United Kingdom)
 Grand Loge "Humanitas Bohemia" (Czech Republic)
 Groupement Maconnique de Loges Mixtes et Indépendentes (France)
 Maçons Lliures Mare Nostrum (Spain)
 Ordine Massonico Tradizionale Italiano (Italy)
Grand Lodge of Freemasonry for Men & Women of Greece.
Grand Lodge of Modern Mixed Mason (United Kingdom)

Former members
 Nederlandse grootloge der gemengde vrijmetsalerij
 Jus Humanum Suecia (Sweden)
 Grande Loja Arquitetos de Aquario (Brasil)
 Gran Loggia d' Italia degli ALAM (Italy)

See also
 CLIPSAS
 Grand Orient of Belgium
 Grande Loge Nationale Française
 International Secretariat of the Masonic Adogmatic Powers

Sources
 International Masonic Union Catena
 Henderson, Kent & Pope, Tony: Freemasonry Universal, 2 vols, Global Masonic Publications, Melbourne 1998, 2000, vol 2 p 6.

References

Co-Freemasonry
Masonic organizations